Skateboard GB is the governing body for skateboarding in the UK and represents the home nations of England, Scotland, Wales and Northern Ireland at the National Olympic Committee.

In December 2020 Skateboard GB was the recipient of a UK Sport grant of £1,672,485 for the Paris 2024 Olympics. The grant represents a significant increase from the £166,825 awarded by the UK government-backed Aspiration Fund in 2018 for the Tokyo 2020 Olympics.

In July 2020 founding chair Lucy Adams stepped down to spend more time with her family and was replaced by Alex Jordan.

Team GB

Skateboard GB is responsible for selecting, preparing and managing the British Skateboarding Team which includes Sky Brown who was set to become Britain's youngest Olympian at the Tokyo 2020 Olympics. The other team members include Alex Decunha, Sam Beckett, Alex Hallford and Jordan Thackary, with Team Manager Darren Pearcy

Skateboard England merger

In December 2020 it was announced that Skateboard GB and Skateboard England, the National Governing Body for skateboarding in England and Wales, would merge

References

External links
 Skateboard GB
 Skateboard England
 Skateboard Scotland

Sports organizations established in 2017
Skateboarding organizations